The 18th Irish Film & Television Academy Awards, also called the IFTA Film & Drama Awards 2022, took place in March 2022. The ceremony honours Irish films and television drama released between 1 January 2021 and 11 March 2022. Nominations were announced on 22 February 2022. The ceremony aired on Virgin Media One on 12 March 2022, hosted by Deirdre O'Kane.

Film

Best film
 An Cailín Ciúin (winner)
 Belfast
 Deadly Cuts
 Swan Song
Who We Love
You Are Not My Mother

Director
Colm Bairéad – An Cailín Ciúin (winner)    
Kenneth Branagh – Belfast
Graham Cantwell – Who We Love  
Benjamin Cleary – Swan Song     
Kate Dolan – You Are Not My Mother                   
Paddy Slattery – Broken Law

Script 
Kenneth Branagh – Belfast (winner)   
 Graham Cantwell and Katie McNeice – Who We Love  
Benjamin Cleary – Swan Song                   
 Phlip Doherty – Redemption of a Rogue                           
Kate Dolan – You Are Not My Mother

Actress in a leading role
Niamh Algar – Censor
 Angeline Ball – Deadly Cuts 
 Catherine Clinch – An Cailín Ciúin (winner)
 Gemma-Leah Devereux – The Bright Side
Hazel Doupe – You Are Not My Mother

Actor in a leading role
Peter Coonan – Doineann
Moe Dunford – Nightride (winner)
Jude Hill – Belfast
Aaron Monaghan – Redemption of a Rogue
 Dónall Ó Héalai – Foscadh

Actress in a supporting role
 Caitríona Balfe – Belfast
Jessie Buckley – The Lost Daughter (winner)
 Carrie Crowley – An Cailín Ciúin
 Amy-Joyce Hastings – Who We Love
 Ruth Negga – Passing

Actor in a supporting role
 Jamie Dornan – Belfast
Ciarán Hinds – Belfast (winner)
Cillian Ó Gairbhí – Foscadh
 Dean Quinn – Who We Love
Tom Vaughan-Lawlor – The Bright Side

George Morrison Feature Documentary
Castro's Spies
Love Yourself Today
Lyra
Pure Grit
The Dance
''Young Plato (winner)Short film – Live action

 A White Horse
 Best Foot Forward
 Debutante
 Harvest
 Nothing to Declare (winner) Scrap
 Ship of Souls
 Silence
 The Colour Between
 The Passion

Animated short 
 Bardo             
 Da Humbug                   
 Fall of the Ibis King (winner)        
 Memento Mori

Television drama
Drama

 Hidden Assets (RTÉ One / BBC Four) 
 KIN (RTÉ One) (winner) Smother, series 2 (RTÉ One)
 Vikings: Valhalla (Netflix)

Director
 Ciaran Donnelly – The Wheel of Time 
Dathaí Keane – Smother
Diarmuid Goggins – KINHannah Quinn – Vikings: Valhalla (winner)Lisa Mulcahy – Ridley Road

Script
Declan Croghan – Vikings: Valhalla
Kate O'Riordan – Smother
Morna Regan – Hidden Assets
John Morton – Hidden Assets
Peter McKenna – Hidden AssetsPeter McKenna – KIN (winner)Actress in a leading role

Angeline Ball – Hidden Assets Clare Dunne – KIN (winner) Dervla Kirwan – Smother 
Niamh Algar – Deceit
Sinéad Keenan – Three Families

Actor in a leading role
 Aidan Gillen – KIN
 James Nesbitt – Stay Close
 Liam Cunningham – Domina
 Sam Keeley – KIN (winner)Actress in a supporting role

 Cathy Belton – Hidden Assets
 Justine Mitchell – Smother
 Lola Petticrew – Three Families
 Maria Doyle Kennedy – KIN (winner) Simone Kirby – Hidden Assets

Actor in a supporting role
Andrew Scott – The Pursuit of LoveCiarán Hinds – KIN (winner) Emmett J. Scanlan – KIN
 Owen McDonnell – Three Families
 Peter Coonan – Hidden Assets

Craft
Original Music

 David Holmes – KIN
 Die Hexen – You Are Not My Mother
Joseph Conlan – Who We Love Stephen Rennicks – An Cailín Ciúin (winner)Van Morrison – Belfast

Editing

 Dermot Diskin – KINJohn Murphy – An Cailín Ciúin (winner) Nathan Nugent – Swan Song
Tony Cranstoun – Zone 414
 Úna Ní Dhonghaíle – Belfast

Production Design

 Derek Wallace – KIN
 Emma Lowney – An Cailín Ciúin (winner) Joe Fallover – Wolf
 Tom Conroy – Vikings: Valhalla
 Tamara Conboy – Deadly Cuts

Cinematography

Burschi Wojnar – Redemption of a Rogue
 Kate McCullough – An Cailín Ciúin (winner) James Mather – KIN
Narayan Van Maele – You Are Not My Mother 
Peter Robertson – Vikings: Valhalla

Costume Design

 Eimer Ní Mhaoldomhnaigh – Foundation 
 Kathy Strachan – Deadly Cuts (winner) Louise Stanton – An Cailín Ciúin
 Susan O'Connor Cave – Vikings: Valhalla
 Susan Scott – Zone 414

Makeup & Hair

 Sian Wilson – Belfast
Lyndsey Herron & Edwina Kelly – Deadly Cuts
Linda Gannon & Clare Lambe – FoundationEileen Buggy, Audrey Doyle, Barrie Gower – The Green Knight (winner)Dee Corcoran, Joe Whelan, Thomas McInerney – Vikings: Valhalla

Sound

Aza Hand & Alan Scully – Boys from County Hell
 John "Bob" Brennan, Fionan Higgins, Mark Henry, & Andrew Kirwan – Smother
 Karl Merren & Johnny Marshell – The Green Knight
 Steve Fanagan – Swan Song (winner) Steve Fanagan, John "Bob" Brennan, Brendan Rehill – An Cailín Ciúin

VFX

 Ed Bruce & Andrew Barry – Spider-Man: No Way Home
 Ed Bruce & Andrew Barry – The Nevers
 Ed Bruce & Manuel Martinez – Swan Song
Ed Bruce & Sam Johnston – The Book of Boba FettKevin Cahill & Eric Saindon – The Green Knight'' (winner)

See also
2021 in Irish television
2022 in Irish television
75th British Academy Film Awards
2022 British Academy Television Awards

References

External links
 Awards at the Irish Film and Television Academy official website

2021 in Irish television
18
2021 film awards
2022 television awards
2022 film awards